This is a list of notable bulletin board system (BBS) software packages.

Multi-platform 
 Citadel – originally written for the CP/M operating system, had many forks for different systems under different names.
 CONFER – CONFER II on the MTS, CONFER U on Unix and CONFER V on VAX/VMS, written by Robert Parnes starting in 1975.
 Mystic BBS – written by James Coyle with versions for Windows/Linux/ARM Linux/OSX. Past versions: MS-DOS and OS/2.
 Synchronet – Windows/Linux/BSD, past versions: MS-DOS and OS/2.
 WWIV – WWIV v5.x is supported on both Windows 7+ 32bit as well as Linux 32bit and 64bit. Written by Wayne Bell, included WWIVNet. Past versions: MS-DOS and OS/2.

Altos 68000 
 PicoSpan

Amiga based 
 Ami-Express – aka "/X", very popular in the crackers/warez software scene.
 C-Net – aka "Cnet"

Apple II series 
 Diversi-Dial (DDial) – Chat-room atmosphere supporting up to 7 incoming lines allowing links to other DDial boards.
 GBBS – Applesoft and assembler-based BBS program by Greg Schaeffer.
 GBBS Pro – based on the ACOS or MACOS (modified ACOS) language.
 Net-Works II – by Nick Naimo.
 SBBS – Sonic BBS by Patrick Sonnek.

Apple Macintosh 
 Citadel – including Macadel, MacCitadel.
 FirstClass (SoftArc)
 Hermes
 Second Sight
 TeleFinder

Atari 8-bit computer 
 Atari Message Information System – and derivatives

Commodore computers 
 Blue Board – by Martin Sikes.
 Superboard – by Greg Francis and Randy Schnedler.
 C*Base – by Gunther Birznieks, Jerome P. Yoner, and David Weinehall.
 C-Net DS2 – by Jim Selleck.
 Color64 – by Greg Pfountz.   
 McBBS – by Derek E. McDonald.
 Prometheus – by Martin Brückner.

CP/M 
 CBBS – The first ever BBS software, written by Ward Christensen.
 Citadel
 RBBS
 TBBS

Microsoft Windows 
 Excalibur BBS
 Maximus
Mystic BBS

MS-DOS and compatible 
 Celerity BBS
 Citadel – including DragCit, Cit86, TurboCit, Citadel+
 Ezycom – written by Peter Davies.
 FBB (F6FBB) – packet radio BBS system, still in use.
 GBBS (Graphics BBS) – used in the Melbourne area.
 GT-Power
 L.S.D. BBS – written by The Slavelord of The Humble Guys (THG).
 The Major BBS
 Maximus
 McBBS – by Derek E. McDonald.
 Opus-CBCS – first written by Wynn Wagner III.
 PCBoard
 PegaSys
 ProBoard BBS – written by Philippe Leybaert (Belgium).
 Pyroto Mountain
 QuickBBS – written by Adam Hudson, with assistance by Phil Becker.
 RBBS-PC
 RemoteAccess – written by Andrew Milner.
 Renegade – written by Cott Lang until 1997.  Currently maintained by T.J. McMillen since 2003.
 RoboBOARD/FX – written by Seth Hamilton.
 Searchlight BBS (SLBBS)
 Spitfire
 SuperBBS – by Aki Antman and Risto Virkkala.
 TBBS
 TCL
 Telegard
 TriBBS
 TAG
 Virtual Advanced – also known as VBBS.
 Waffle – written by Tom Dell, and supported UUCP (and Fidonet through extensions).
 Wildcat! – originally by Mustang Software.
 Worldgroup – The latest version of MajorBBS, the last released by Galacticomm.

OS/2 
 AdeptXBBS
 Maximus
 PCBoard
 Virtual Advanced – also known as VBBS.

Tandy TRS-80 
 Forum 80
 TBBS - by Phil Becker, for the Model III/4

Unix and compatible 
 Citadel – including Citadel/UX, Dave's Own Citadel.
 Falken – Linux versions by Chris Whitacre, past MS-DOS versions written by Herb Rose.
 Firebird BBS – Linux-based.
 LysKOM
 Maple BBS
 Maximus
 OpenTG – OpenTelegard BBS
 PCBoard v16 – formerly by CDC, now by MP Solutions, LLC.
 PicoSpan
 Waffle (BBS software)

References 

BBS
Bulletin board system